Go-Go Boy Interrupted is an LGBT-themed comedy web series that premiered on YouTube in October 2014. Adapted from a Groundlings sketch comedy act of the same name, the series stars and was created by Jimmy Fowlie. It chronicles the adventures of Danny Carter, a 30-year-old "washed up" male go-go dancer. Fowlie commented on each of the first seven episodes via a column at HuffingtonPost.com as they were released.

Overview
In the series, Fowlie portrays Danny Carter,  a 30-year-old "washed up" male go-go dancer who "must discover a way to find his 'purpose' and survive within a different lifestyle as he moves on from go-going." Based on Fowlie's experience as a go-go dancer in West Hollywood while attending the University of Southern California, the series asks the question, "What happens next after a go-go boy ages out of his profession?" Fowlie told The Huffington Post in 2014:

Fowlie first performed Go-Go Boy Interrupted in June 2014 as a live sketch comedy show at The Groundlings. According to Fowlie, the show continued with four months of sold-out shows, and he adapted it into a web series. The live version is ongoing, with periodic performances scheduled through 2015.

Cast

 Jimmy Fowlie as Danny Carter (Seasons 1–2)
 Drew Droege as Ann Ziety, Danny's boss at Club Pantherwarmth (Seasons 1–2)
 Lynne Marie Stewart as Danny's Mom (Seasons 1–2)
 Brian Jordan Alvarez as Eliot, a go-go dancer (Seasons 1–2)
 Navaris Dawson as James, a go-go dancer (Seasons 1–2)
 Dakota Greene as Ricky, a go-go dancer (Seasons 1–2)
 Jacob Matthews as Chris, a go-go dancer (Seasons 1–2)
 Scott Evans as himself (Seasons 1–2)
 Dillon Field as Chad, Scott's friend (Seasons 1–2)
 Mitch Silpa as Rich, Danny's one night stand (Season 1)
 Tessa Goss as Andrea, a mother of two (Season 1)
 Nico Santos as Nick, Danny's friend (Season 1)
 Jordan Black as Cashew, a homeless man (Season 2)
 Henry McMillan as Martin, Scott's friend (Season 2)
 Heather Morris as Katie, a go-go dancer (Season 2)
 Willam Belli as Willam, the new manager of Club Pantherwarmth (Season 2)
 Nick Adams as Keith (Season 2)
 Fortune Feimster as Fortune, a doorperson (Season 2)
 Chris Eckert as Jonathan, Danny's brother (Season 2)
 Karen Maruyama as Liz (Season 2)
 Briga Heelan as Ashley, Danny's ex-girlfriend (Season 2)
 Chris Riggi as Taylor (Season 2)
 Katie O'Brien as Krista, Danny's sister (Season 2)
 Jessica Perlman as Jazz the Makeup Girl (Season 2)
 Pablo Hernandez as Pablo, a go-go dancer (Season 2)
 John Suazo as Big Rod , a go-go dancer (Season 2)
 Katrina Kemp as Katrina (Season 2)

Episodes

Season 1 (2014)

Season 2 (2016)

Production and broadcast
Go-Go Boy Interrupted premiered on YouTube in October 2014. Fowlie commented on each of the first seven episodes via a column at HuffingtonPost.com as they were released.

A Kickstarter crowdfunding campaign ending in October 2015 was established to fund a potential second season, and 450 contributors raised $69,033 for the project. Towleroad reported in September 2015 that Droege, Stewart and Evans would return alongside new additions including Heather Morris, Briga Heelan, Chris Riggi, Willam Belli, Nick Adams, Karen Maruyama and Fortune Feimster.

Season 2 premiered on April 12, 2016, with a new episode following on each Tuesday for 14 weeks.

Reception
Daniel Reynolds of The Advocate praised Go-Go Boy Interrupted as "hilarious" and "uproarious", and Sean Mandell of Towleroad called the series "irreverent". TheGayUK called it "wonderfully hilarious" and a "delightfully entertaining slice of West Hollywood gay life."

The series won the 2017 Queerty Award for Best Web Series.

References

External links
 
 
 
 

2014 web series debuts
American comedy web series
American LGBT-related web series